Samay are a band based in Leeds, UK, formed by musicians from India and Europe who take the traditional music of India and combine it with jazz, flamenco, samba, funk and chill-out.

Overview 
The band consist of Jesse Bannister (UK), Soumik Datta (India), Giuliano Modarelli (Italy), Bhupinder Singh Chaggar (India) and Kenneth Higgins (UK) who replaced former bass player Javier Geras (Spain).

Samay play original compositions and since the beginning they started performing in important festival such as Moor Music Festival, Garforth Arts Festival, Seven arts-Leeds and City of London Festival.

In 2007 they performed in television shows such as the Nikki Bedi's Show on BBC Asian Network and at Doordarshan TV UK.

In 2008, they released their first album, Songs for a Global Journey.

In order to support the album, they played at the Musicport World Music Festival, Beverley Folk Festival, Darbar Festival, Dingwalls and   London Jazz Festival.

Members
 Jesse Bannister (UK) – saxophone
 Soumik Datta (Bengal, India) – sarod
 Giuliano Modarelli (Italy) – guitar
 Bhupinder Singh Chaggar (Punjab, India) – tabla
 Kenneth Higgins (UK) – bass

Discography

Studio albums
 Songs for a Global Journey – 2008

References

External links
Official website
Myspace
On womex.com

British world music groups
Musical groups from Leeds
Musical groups established in 2005